An akim (әкімдер / äkimder; ;) is the head of a local government in Kazakhstan and Kyrgyzstan. Akim is derived from the Arabic word   hakim, which means "ruler" or "governor".

Definitions

Kazakhstan 
In Kazakhstan, an äkim is the head of an äkimdik, a municipal, district, or provincial government (äkimdik), and serves as the Presidential representative. Äkims of provinces and cities are appointed to the post by the President on the advice of the Prime Minister. Meanwhile, the äkims of other administrative and territorial units are appointed or selected to the post in an order defined by the President. He may also dismiss äkims from their posts. Powers of äkims ends with the introduction into the post of new-elected president of the republic. Thus, the äkim continues to fulfill the duties before appointment of corresponding äkim by the President of Kazakhstan.

Kyrgyzstan 
In Kyrgyzstan, an akim is a head of an akimiat (state regional administration).

References

External links
Akims of provinces of the Republic of Kazakhstan

Government of Kazakhstan
Government of Kyrgyzstan

wo:Akim